This is a list of governors for Blekinge County in Sweden, from 1683 to the present. For the period 1658–1669 and 1675–1680, see Governors-General, Scania. Between 1670 and 1675, Blekinge was included in Kristianstad County and between 1680 and 1683, the province was included in Kalmar County. For the period 1680–1683, see List of governors of Kalmar County.

Footnotes

References

Blekinge